Sahiwal Tehsil  (Punjabi,), is a subdivision (Tehsil) of Sargodha District in the Punjab province of Pakistan. It is approx. 40 km from Sargodha at main Sargodha-Multan highway. It is administratively subdivided into 14 Union Councils, two of which form the Tehsil capital Sahiwal.
The population of the city is 236,000 (2015 estimate) most being Muslim and speak the Punjabi language. Jehlum River passes nearby.

History, Geography and Background
According to the research of the archeologists, Tehsil Sahiwal is settled before BC. But it continued to deteriorate with the passage of time. Its centuries-old ruins, mounds and other artifacts proving that this region was repeatedly destroyed;
however, the present city Sahiwal was inhibited about 570 years ago.
The tribe Jhammat was inhibited here for the last 22 generations, and Sahiwal
was named after the name of a person Sahi of Jhammat Tribe. Two hundred years later after the establishment of city Sahiwal another Baloch tribe dominated here,
it entered into the region from Arabia via Iran (Khorasan).
There are six gates at the intersection of the city that are renowned for their architecture. These doors are called Lahori Darvaza that is known as Khooni Darvaza( When Ranjeet Singh invaded the city and bloodshed occurred near
the Lahori Gate so it was called Khooni Gate), Kashmiri Darvaza (Door), Peshawari Darvaza also called Jhammati Darvaza, Kabli Darvaza, Mastana Dargahi Darvaza, and Multani Darvaza.
Now Sahiwal city has spread, however, the old city is surrounded by a strong wall and only the inner gates of the city have to be used for mobility. The walls and entrances around the city remain for centuries due to strong and ancient
architecture but due to unlawful encroachment by the citizens the beauty of
the city has faded.
Before the emergence of Pakistan, Sahiwal was the center of Hindu traders. Hindu community lived along with Muslims in it and there were many temples and Hindu worship places in the city.
The idols in the dunes and ruins also indicate that Hinduism was the earliest religion of the region.
After the emergence of Pakistan, the Hindus migrated to India but their worship places and houses of the Hindu community are still here. Sahiwal was considered the only city where the tombs belonging to the Hindus still exist.
An exploration of history reveals that Sher Shah Soori was here in the pursuit of Hamayun and stayed here and during his stay, he constructed a Mosque, later it was known as Sher Shah Soori Mosque.

Geographically, Sahiwal was spread on a big area consisting of three big mounds was located on the brink of River Jhelum. The name of the biggest mound of the ruins were known as Panj Peer, and there was a sitting place of a saint named Hayat Almeer on top of Mound.
The second mound interprets 2500 old cultures of the city whereas the third mound is called Gardwani Marri having much ancient Hindu civilization. After digging there were found signs of Hindu Temples, shrines, and residential areas.
According to archeologists the city Sahiwal was already inhabited when Alexander attacked the subcontinent. The inhabitants of the destroyed city together with the army of Raja Porus tried to stop the mounting steps of Alexander the Great.

Being on the brink of river Jhelum, people used to farm, transaction occurs under the Barter System. On the West side of the dunes, there were signs of a huge cave which was supposedly the entrance door to the wrecked city. Despite the public humiliation and climatic change, there is still a 70-foot high mound there.
With reference to history, Nehang, an area of Sahiwal has much importance. Tibba Panj Peer situated in Nehang was denoted by the name of renowned saint Hayat Almeer.
The place Panj Peer was the center of attention for the people, furthermore, an Urs has been celebrated here on January 15, 16 every year. There are 9 yards graves besides Hayat Almeer.
It is interesting to note there saints were not tall in stature but the pilgrims of Panj Peer used to make long graves to highlight the importance of their Saints. For Hindus, these graves had much importance because of their faith they used to attribute them to five Pandas.

Local Politics
It is known for its rich cultural heritage and historical significance, as well as its vibrant political landscape. The city has been the site of several important political movements and has been home to many influential political leaders over the years.

One significant event that has had a lasting impact on the politics of Sahiwal was the mass migration of people from India to Pakistan during the partition in 1947. Many families were forced to leave their homes and move to Sahiwal and other parts of Pakistan. One of the leaders of this migration was Ali Sher, who played an important role in helping the migrants settle in their new homes. Ali Sher was a prominent figure in Sahiwal's politics and became a well-respected leader in the community.

Today, Ali Sher's grandson Ch Amir Bilal continues to be involved in the politics of Sahiwal. He is a passionate advocate for the rights of the local community and works tirelessly to improve the lives of the people of Sahiwal.

Another family that has had a significant impact on the local politics of Sahiwal is the Balouch family, which is headed by Sardar Mubarik Khan. The Balouch family has been involved in politics for several generations and has played a key role in shaping the political landscape of the city. The sons of Sardar Mubarik Khan are actively involved in local politics and have been instrumental in promoting social and economic development in the area.

Overall, the politics of Sahiwal are shaped by a rich and diverse history, as well as by the hard work and dedication of its many political leaders. The contributions of families like the Ali Sher and Balouch families have helped to make Sahiwal a vibrant and dynamic city that continues to thrive and grow.

Administration
The Tehsil of Sahiwal is administratively subdivided into 14  Union Councils, these are:

  Azmatwala
  Dera Jara
  Farooka (Urban)                        
  Jahanian Shah
  Kudlathi Ara
  Lakhiwal Sharif
  Majoka
  Radhan
  Sahiwal-I
  Sahiwal-II
  Sajoka
  Sial Sharif
  Thati Jalal
  Vijh

Notable people 

 Sardar Shafqat Hayat Baloch - Ex MNA National Assembly of Pakistan
 Ali Asghar Lahri - MPA and ex Tehsil Nazim
 Pir Nizam Uddin Sialvi - ex MPA
 Nawabzada Ilyas Qureshi - Ex- MPA and Advisor to Chief Minister Provincial Assembly of the Punjab
 Rai Haq Nawaz Dhudy -retired Polo player
 Syed Nusrat Ali Shah - Ex-Federal Minister

References 

{{|url=https://na.gov.pk/en/profile.php?uid=1018}}
Sargodha District
Tehsils of Punjab, Pakistan
Populated places in Sargodha District